is a railway station in Higashihiroshima, Hiroshima Prefecture, Japan,  operated by West Japan Railway Company (JR West).

Lines
Kōchi Station is served by the Sanyō Main Line.

Layout
Kōchi Station consists of one side platform, one island platform, and a station office on ground-level. The two platforms are connected by a footbridge.

See also
 List of railway stations in Japan

References

External links

  

Railway stations in Hiroshima Prefecture
Sanyō Main Line
Railway stations in Japan opened in 1894